Lisa del Bo (born Reinhilde Goossens on 9 June 1961 in Mopertingen, Belgium) is a Belgian singer who is popular in her own country and also in Germany. Lisa del Bo is a Flemish singer who often sings in the Dutch language but has been known to record songs in other languages as well.

She represented Belgium in the Eurovision Song Contest 1996 with the song "Liefde is een kaartspel", where she came 16th.

She recorded a duet with fellow Belgian Helmut Lotti.

Singles 
1991 "Maar nu, wat doe ik zonder jou" (Madame)
1992 "Liefde" (Lidia a Mosca)
1993 "Vlinder"
1993 "Ergens"
1994 "Leef nu met een lach"
1994 "Eindeloos"
1995 "Mijn hart is van slag"
1995 "Van alles"
1996 "Liefde is een kaartspel" (Love is a card game)
1996 "Morgen" (Tell him)
1996 "Roosje"
1997 "Alleen voor jou"
1998 "Eenzaam zonder jou" – with Bart Kaell
1998 "Met 16 kan je nog dromen" (At 16, one can still have dreams)
1998 "De drie klokken"
1999 "Zeldzaam gevoel"
2000 "Nooit op zondag"
2003 "Tussen Heist en de Ardennen" – with Willy Sommers and Luc Steeno
2004 "Jij" (Love will keep us together)

See also 
Belgium in the Eurovision Song Contest 1996

External links 
  (in Dutch)
 Fansite (in Dutch)
 Liefde is een kaartspel lyrics and translation

1961 births
Living people
People from Bilzen
Dutch-language singers of Belgium
Belgian women singers
Eurovision Song Contest entrants for Belgium
Eurovision Song Contest entrants of 1996